Ganesh N. Devy (born 1 August 1950) is an Indian literary critic and former professor. He is known for the People's Linguistic Survey of India and the Adivasi Academy created by him. He is credited to start the Bhaashaa research and Publication Centre. He writes in three languages—Marathi, Gujarati and English. His first full length book in English is After Amnesia (1992). He has written and edited close to ninety  books in areas including Literary Criticism, Anthropology, Education, Linguistics and Philosophy.

Biography
G. N. Devy was educated at Shivaji University, Kolhapur and the University of Leeds, UK. Among his many academic assignments, he held fellowships at Leeds University and Yale University and has been THB Symons Fellow (1991–92) and Jawaharlal Nehru Fellow (1994–96). He was a Professor of English at the Maharaja Sayajirao University of Baroda from 1980 to 96. In 1996, he gave up his academic career in order to initiate work with the Denotified and Nomadic Tribes (DNT) and Adivasis. During this work, he created the Bhasha Research and Publication Centre at Baroda, the Adivasis Academy at Tejgadh, the DNT-Rights Action Group and several other initiatives. Later he initiated the largest-ever survey of languages in history, carried out with the help of nearly 3000 volunteers and published in 50 multilingual volumes.

Dakshinayan 
In response to the growing intolerance and murders of several intellectuals in India, he launched the Dakshinayan (Southward) movement of artists, writers, and intellectuals. In order to lead this movement and to initiate his work on mapping the world's linguistic diversity, he moved to Dharwad in 2016. Devy returned his Sahitya Akademi Award in October 2015 as a mark of protest and in solidarity with other writers sensing a threat to Indian democracy, secularism and freedom of expression and "growing intolerance towards differences of opinion" under the right-wing government.  The Dakshinayan movement follows the ideas of Mahatma Gandhi and Dr. Babasaheb Ambedkar. The movement has spread to several states in India such as Gujarat, Maharashtra, Karnataka, Goa, Telangana, West Bengal, Uttara Khand, Punjab and Delhi.

Awards
G. N. Devy has received several Lifetime Achievement Awards. He was awarded Padma Shri on 26 January 2014 in recognition of his work with denotified and nomadic tribes and endangered languages. He was awarded the Sahitya Akademi Award (1993) for After Amnesia, and the SAARC Writers’ Foundation Award (2001) for his work with denotified tribals. He was given the reputed Prince Claus Award (2003) for his work for the conservation of tribal arts and craft. His Marathi book Vanaprasth received eight awards including the Durga Bhagwat Memorial Award and the Maharashtra Foundation Award. Along with Laxman Gaikwad and Mahashweta Devi, he was one of the founders of The Denotified and Nomadic Tribes Rights Action Group (DNT-RAG). He won the 2011 Linguapax Prize for his work for the preservation of linguistic diversity.

Works
 Critical Thought (1987)
 After Amnesia (1992)
 Of Many Heroes (1997)
 India Between Tradition and Modernity (co-edited, 1997)
 In Another Tongue (2000)
 Indian Literary Criticism: Theory & Interpretation (2002).
 Painted Words: An Anthology of Tribal Literature (editor, 2002).
 A Nomad Called Thief (2006)
 Keywords: Truth (contributor, date unknown)
 Vaanprastha (in Marathi, date unknown)
 Adivasi Jane Che ( Tribal People Knows, in Gujarati, date unknown).
 The G. N. Devy Reader (2009)
The Being of Bhasha (2014)
Samvad ( in Gujarati, 2016)
The Crisis Within: On Knowledge and Education in India (2017)
Trijyaa (in Marathi, 2018)
The question of Silence (2019)
Countering Violence (2019)

See also

Indian literature
Indian English Literature

References

External links 
 Adivasi Academy, Tejgadh- founded by G. N. Devy
 
 Archival Material at Leeds Library : G. N. Devy
 Books at Google Books : G. N. Devy

Transcription of Devy's TED talk about life and death of languages

1950 births
Living people
Dalit activists
Indian literary critics
Recipients of the Sahitya Akademi Award in English
Writers from Gujarat
Indian magazine editors
Academic staff of Maharaja Sayajirao University of Baroda
Alumni of the University of Leeds
Shivaji University alumni
Recipients of the Padma Shri in literature & education
English-language writers from India
Indian political writers
Indian folklorists
20th-century Indian non-fiction writers
Indian male writers